Nuts was a British lad's mag published weekly in the United Kingdom and sold every Tuesday. Nuts marketing campaign at its launch in 2004 used the slogan "When You Really Need Something Funny".

The magazine closed in April 2014.

Sector profile

Nuts main rival magazine was Zoo, another weekly, which was aimed at much the same demographic, 18–30-year-old men, and had similar content. Nuts always outsold Zoo, with the sales figures for the later half of 2013 showing a gap of nearly 25,000 copies per week. Other magazines in competition with Nuts were Zip and men's monthly publications such as FHM and Loaded.

Decline and closure
The circulation of the magazine declined from 2007 onwards. The average number of copies sold in the second half of 2013 was 53,342, whereas the magazine had sales of 306,802 at its peak in 2005.

On 8 August 2013, Dominic Smith, the magazine's editor, announced that their publication would no longer be sold by Co-op supermarkets. Smith withdrew the publication in response to the Co-op's request for publishers to put their 'lads' mags' in modesty bags to mask their explicit front covers. The Co-op said that it was responding to consumer concern.

In March 2014 IPC Media announced that Nuts might soon cease publication after a 30-day consultation with staff. Digital monthly sales of 8,776 (Jul-Dec 2013) suggested to industry observers that the magazine was not making a successful transition to an online platform.

The magazine's last issue was published on 29 April 2014. Lucy Pinder, who was a regular model for Nuts, appeared on the cover of the last issue. The Independent journalist Ella Alexander wrote at the time: "The magazine stayed true to its ethos right until the bitter end – passive, unthreatening, with (objectified versions of) women for everyone."

See also
 Lad culture
 Hot Shots Calendar
 Striker (comic)

References

External links
 Nuts Magazine Official web site

2004 establishments in the United Kingdom
2014 disestablishments in the United Kingdom
Men's magazines published in the United Kingdom
Weekly magazines published in the United Kingdom
Defunct magazines published in the United Kingdom
Magazines established in 2004
Magazines disestablished in 2014